Richard Field Lewis Jr. (May 18, 1907 – October 18, 1957) was an American radio network owner of Richard Field Lewis Jr. Stations (later Mid Atlantic Network Inc.) in the mid-20th Century.

Background

Richard Field Lewis Jr. was born on May 18, 1907, in Winchester, Virginia.  He had a sister, later known as Mrs. E.L. Anderson.

Career

In 1941, Lewis built the station for and licensed WINC, an ABC affiliate, in Winchester, Virginia.

In 1946, he licensed WRFL (FM), also in Winchester.

In the early 1950s, Richard F. Lewis, Jr., hired Whittaker Chambers briefly at WINC—the first work Chambers got after he had left TIME magazine in December 1948 (as the Hiss Case turned from HUAC hearings in Washington, a slander suit in Baltimore, and a grand jury investigation in New York into a federal case against Alger Hiss).

In September 1952, Lewis licensed WLXW (AM) in Carlisle, Pennsylvania for $70,000.

By 1956-7, according to Telecasting Yearbook, Lewis owned a Mid-Atlantic network that comprised:
 Wincheser, VA:  WINC, WRFL (FM)
 Mt. Jackson, VA:  WSIG (AM)
 Fredericksburg, VA:  WFVA (AM) (60%)
 Waynesboro, PA:  WAYZ (AM) (now WLIN)
 Carlisle, PA:  WHYL (AM)
 Fisher, WV:  WELD (AM)

At his death in 1957, his network had added WAGE (AM) (now WTSD) in Leesburg, VA.

Upon his death, his wife Marion Park Lewis took over the business, renamed it "Mid Atlantic Network Inc.," and ran it from 1957 to 1971.

Personal life and death

Lewis married Marion Park Lewis; they had three sons—John, David, and Howard.

Lewis died age 50 on October 18, 1957, in Washington, DC, of natural causes while on a visit there from Winchester.

Legacy

In addition to surviving radio stations, in 1992 his wife founded the Marion Park Lewis Foundation for the Arts, which offers scholarships for Northern Shenandoah Valley students.

See also

 WINC (AM)
 WFVA
 WLIN (AM)
 WTSD (AM)
 WHYL
 WELD (AM)
 Radio network
 List of United States radio networks

References

External sources

 Richard Field Lewis, Jr.
 FCC Data: WTSD

1907 births
1957 deaths